Dorman is a surname, derived from the Middle English word dere, or deor, meant "wild animal". Therefore, Dorman translates as "wild animal", or, perhaps, "wild animal-man". Another, Old English, derivation is from the Old English word deor, meaning "deer", and, mann, meaning "man": thus, Deer Man. Dorman is also a Turkic name which was widely used by the Cumans and Pechenegs. Notable people with the surname include:

People
Andy Dorman (born 1982), Welsh football (soccer) player
Angela Dohrmann, American television actress 
Arabella Dorman (born 1965), British artist
 Sir Arthur Dorman, 1st Baronet (1848–1931), British industrialist, founder of Dorman Long
Avner Dorman (born 1975), Israeli contemporary composer
Dave Dorman (born 1958), American science fiction and fantasy illustrator
David Dorman (born 1954), American telecommunications executive, chairman and chief executive officer of AT&T Inc.
Eric Dorman-Smith (1895–1969), British Army officer
Henry Dorman (1916-1998), American politician and lawyer
Isaiah Dorman (died 1876), African American interpreter for the United States Army during the Indian Wars
John J. Dorman, Fire Commissioner of the City of New York
Lee Dorman (1942–2012), American bass guitarist, member of Iron Butterfly
Maurice Henry Dorman (1902–1993), British diplomat, served as Governors-General of Sierra Leone and Malta
Orloff M. Dorman (1809–1879), justice of the Supreme Court of Virginia
Peter Dorman, American epigraphist, philologist, and cultural anthropologist
Reginald Dorman-Smith (1899–1977), British diplomat, soldier and politician, UK Minister of Agriculture
Robert Dorman (1859–1937), Irish socialist activist
Sonya Dorman (1924–2005), American poet
Thomas Dorman, English Catholic theologian of the sixteenth century
Dorman (12th century), was either a Cuman warrior in Bulgarian service or a Bulgarian noble of Cuman origin, who ruled the region of Braničevo as an independent state.

Commerce
 Dorman Products, an American aftermarket manufacturer of car parts
 W.H. Dorman & Co, an English tool company serving the shoe industry

Places
Derman, Iran, sometimes romanized as "Dorman"
Dormans, a French commune
Dormanstown, area of Redcar, North Yorkshire

Things
Dorman raspberry

See also 
Dohrmann
Dorman High School
Dorman Luke construction a type of Dual polyhedron
Dorman Long a British engineering company 
Dorman Museum in Linthorpe, Middlesbrough
W.H. Dorman & Co Ltd engine manufacturer in Stafford, UK

References